Shahrak-e Shahid Rajai or Shahrak-e Shahid Rejai or Shahrak-e Shahidar Jai may refer to the following things named after assassinated Iranian president Mohammad-Ali Rajai:
 Shahrak-e Shahid Rajai, Darab, Fars Province
 Shahrak-e Shahid Rejai, Fasa, Fars Province
 Shahrak-e Shahid Rajai, Hormozgan
 Shahrak-e Shahid Rajai, Ilam
 Shahrak-e Shahidar Jai, Bagh-e Malek, Khuzestan Province
 Shahrak-e Shahid Rajai, Ramhormoz, Khuzestan Province
 Shahrak-e Shahid Rajai, Shush, Khuzestan Province
 Shahrak-e Shahid Rejai, Markazi
 Shahrak-e Shahid Rejai, Mazandaran

See also
 Shahid Rajai (disambiguation)